Sigal Shachmon (born 13 June 1971 in Petah Tikva, Israel) is an Israeli model, actress and television presenter.

Life and career
Shachmon was born in Petah Tikva. Before she made her big breakthrough she was a dancer in a dance company and worked in modeling. In 1989 she performed at the Israeli national final for the Eurovision Song Contest as one of Nissim Gama's accompaniments in his song "Passes With Time". Erez Tal saw the potential of Shachmon and took her to guide his show The Wonderful World. At the same time, Gonzalez finished her role as a Wheel of Fortune girl and was replaced by Shachamon in 1996.

Between 1998 and 1999, Shachmon co-hosted Channel 2's version of Fort Boyard (המבצר - Ha-Mivtzar) alongside Aki Avni and program introductions alongside Nti Rbitz. After which she received her own program called Sparkling.

In 1999 she hosted the Eurovision Song Contest 1999, which took place in Jerusalem's International Convention Center, together with Yigal Ravid and Dafna Dekel.

Personal life
She had a relationship with actor Aki Avni. In December 2002 she married businessman Ofer Amir, and in December 2004 her eldest son was born. She separated from her husband in 2007, about two months before giving birth to her second son.

Shachmon lives in Rishpon.

See also
 List of Eurovision Song Contest presenters

References

External links

 

Living people
1971 births
Israeli female models
Israeli television presenters
People from Petah Tikva
Israeli women television presenters